Miss Venezuela (Spanish: Organización Miss Venezuela) is the national beauty pageant of Venezuela, traditionally held in September. It is preceded by two or three months of preliminary events, with the awarding of corporate prizes. The final televised competition generally lasts about four hours and is broadcast live across Latin America by Venevisión and produced by the networks parent company Cisneros Group, with edited versions to the United States and Mexico on the Univision and Telemundo networks. From 2013 to 2015, the national contest was split into two separate pageants: Miss Venezuela (to select representatives to Miss Universe, Miss Earth and Miss International) and Miss Venezuela Mundo (representative to Miss World). The pageant is also closely observed by other countries seeking to level competition due to its illustrious record of pageant victories. In 2016, the Venezuelan franchise for Miss Earth was awarded to Miss Earth Venezuela organized by National Directors Julio César Cruz and Alyz Henrich.

Venezuela has gained the most titles in the Big Four international beauty pageants with 23 victories and outstanding record of placements at Miss Universe, Miss World, Miss International and Miss Earth, considered the most important pageants in the world. Under the direction of Osmel Sousa, Venezuela has accumulated more Big Four international pageant titles than any other country, including seven Miss Universe winners, six Miss World winners, eight Miss International winners and one Miss Earth winner (The other Miss Earth winner is under Sambil Model Organization).

The latest edition of the pageant was held on 16 November 2022. Accordingly, the new national director of Venezuela is Maria Gabriela Isler, the 62nd Miss Universe titleholder.

Venezuelan winners at the Big Four pageants 

A girl wishing to compete in the pageant starts at either the local level, if a regional contest is held in her state, or goes directly to the pageant's headquarters in Caracas. Regional contests generally select three to six candidates (except for the massive Miss Centroccidental pageant, which covers six to seven midwestern states) who will likely represent the state or one nearby: i.e. a candidate who is a finalist for Miss Carabobo will usually expect to represent Carabobo or a neighboring state such as Yaracuy in the final pageant.

Thousands of entrants apply for the pageant each year. Some young women would try for up to five or six years consecutively trying to get one of the 24 to 32 titles that will enable them to compete in the final pageant. Venezuela's 23 states, capital district, islands and the Costa Oriental region of Zulia State are almost always represented; some years other regions of the country will have representatives in the pageant. Although some major states and regions such as Zulia, Táchira, Lara, Bolivar and Carabobo will hold their own preliminaries, many of the states are assigned by geographical proximity or even random drawing to the final contestants. There is therefore considerably less emphasis on state titles than there is in other national pageants such as Miss USA, although certain areas such as Miranda, Nueva Esparta, Capital District, Guarico, Vargas and Carabobo always seem to achieve high results.

Osmel Sousa, former president of the pageant, always sat on the selection panel regardless of whether it was a final regional contest or the direct "auditions", and it was not uncommon for him to overturn the entire regional results in favor of his own choices. For example, none of the candidates in 2004 for Vargas state were deemed fit for competition, so a candidate from Caracas was appointed Miss Vargas. Winners therefore have often never visited the state they represent. In this fashion, rather than waste five or six candidates from a strong area of the country such as Zulia in a system wherein only one can represent the state, the pageant distributes "spare states" to them so all have an opportunity to demonstrate their capabilities in the final night. Traditionally, strong candidates have been pulled from Caracas, Zulia and Carabobo states, although they can come from all over the country; e.g. in 2003 the Miss Centroccidental pageant sent seven candidates to the pageant, while in 2005 only one proceeded to the finals.  In 2000, the casting made in Zulia State (called Miss Venezuela Zulia at that time) sent 7 girls to that year's finals.

The pageant reserves the right to remove any candidate that is deemed not to be performing up to standard, so there is no guarantee that a contestant may participate in the final night of competition. However, such decisions are usually made before the delegates are convened and the various state sashes are handed out. The pageant keeps a "reserve" pool of willing candidates always available to replace any last minute rejected contestant. Many aspirants will also make it into the final 50 or 60, only to be eliminated from the final roster of 26–32 contestants. Such eliminations have no real bearing on how well the contestant will do in the future. Mariangel Ruiz, Miss Venezuela 2002, did not place into the final 120 in 1998; Barbara Clara, second runner-up in 2004, had previously tried for the pageant three times before winning a title at the last minute in 2004.

Reentry into the final pageant is rare, although the rules are arbitrary and not as restrictive as those in other countries. Only one contestant has ever participated in the official Miss Venezuela pageant twice: Maria Fernanda Leon, who represented Guárico in 1999 and Portuguesa in 2002, making the top 10 in her second attempt. Aida Yespica competed in Miss Venezuela World 2001 but withdrew before being assigned a state for the final pageant her year; she returned in Miss Venezuela 2002 for Amazonas state. The majority of the contestants in 2000 and 2001 competed in both the Miss Venezuela World and Miss Venezuela contests of their respective years; they were assigned numbers for the Miss World preliminary, with the most desirable contestants being allowed to proceed to the final Miss Venezuela pageant with state titles. The ten contestants for Miss Bolivarian Republic of Venezuela (Miss Venezuela for Miss Universe 2000) and the six for Miss Venezuela Mundo 2006 (Miss Venezuela for Miss World 2006) were "recycled" from previous years. This situation was expected to be repeated during the 2007 pageant, in which some contestants were expected to compete again, though it didn't happen.

List of state titles 
There is an unofficial formula to determine the states and regions represented in Venezuela. The base number of contestants over the last decade has been 26–28, which can be increased or decreased by pageant's management.

Official states (23) 

  * Denotes that state has a preliminary pageant – which may or may not still be held – as of 2005 only Táchira, Zulia-Falcón, Lara, Aragua and Sucre held preliminaries.

  ** Denotes that state has been represented through the Miss Centroccidental preliminary. Additionally, three states, Carabobo, Falcon and Mérida hold their own individual pageants.

Official regions (3) 
Costa Oriental (Eastern shore of Lake Maracaibo)
Distrito Capital (Capital District)
Dependencias Federales ("Federal Dependencies" Venezuelan islands)

Together, these 26 regions form the "base" of the Miss Venezuela contest. However, at times other regions and territories have been represented. If there are 27 sashes, the 27th candidate is Miss Peninsula Goajira. If there are 28 sashes, either Canaima (a national park in Bolivar state) or Peninsula de Paraguaná (a region of Falcon state) is represented. In 2003, additional titles of Península de Araya (a region of Sucre State) and Roraima (a national park in Bolivar State) were created to bring the pageant to its highest ever number of contestants: 32. Surprisingly, in 2008 Península de Araya was used again, and there was no Miss Península Goajira or Miss Costa Oriental that year. In the mid-1990s, the districts of Municipio Libertador and Municipio San Francisco were also represented, the last one only in 1997 and 1998. Also, only in 2003, Guayana Esequiba (part of Guyana that historically Venezuela claims as its own) was represented. Vargas State, the most recent modification to Venezuela's map (1999) was always present in the pageant, but with other names: Departamento Vargas (until 1986), Municipio Vargas (1987 to 1997), Territorio Federal Vargas (1998), and Vargas State since 1999. In 2009, only 20 delegates competed for the crown, the same number that competed on the final night in 2003, so some "traditional" states didn't have a representative.

Regional rankings 

 Venezuela's international titleholders represented the following states during their Miss Venezuela competition (indicates year of international victory): Miss Universe: Vargas (1979), Miranda (1981), Trujillo (1986; 2009), Yaracuy (1996), Amazonas (2008) and Guárico (2013); Miss World: Miranda (1955; 1984), Aragua (1981), Zulia (1991), Nueva Esparta (1995) and Amazonas (2011); and Miss International: Monagas (1985), Miranda (1997), Costa Oriental (2000), Carabobo (2003), Barinas (2006; 2018), Trujillo (2010) and Anzoátegui (2015).

Training 

There are Miss Venezuela schools and "beauty factories" in which girls as young as 5 years old are trained to be the next potential Miss Venezuela. At both the schools and factories the young girls and women are taught how to walk properly, given beauty tips, and given lessons in proper etiquette.

Once a candidate is shortlisted for the pageant, she begins an intensive training program which can last for six months. She receives coaching in speech, physical fitness, make-up, modelling, and all the other skills required for the competition. Plastic surgery and cosmetic dentistry are optional, and some delegates elect to use padding. As the Miss Venezuela broadcast lasts up to four hours long, with countless musical numbers and dances, rehearsals require weeks of preparation. Contestants also participate in official photo-shoots and also fittings by fashion designers.

The evening gowns worn by candidates are a major source of politicking by Venezuela's domestic fashion houses, with top designers such as Mayela Camacho, Ángel Sanchez, Durant & Diego, Jose María Almeida, and Gionni Straccia selecting candidates that they will dress for the final night, while other, newer designers compete to present designs for the pageant. As a general rule the evening gowns are always custom-designed for each of the candidates on the final night, and always by a Venezuelan designer. By tradition, Nidal Nouaihed dresses the representatives of his home state of Zulia (Miss Costa Oriental, Miss Peninsula Goajira, Miss Zulia); Ángel Sanchez designs the gown for Miss Trujillo; Jose María Almeida designs the dress for Miss Mérida and the national costume for Miss Venezuela to Miss Universe. In 1999, 26 different designers took part in the evening gown competition, one candidate for each one. Also, in 2006, for the first time ever, the designers appeared on stage with the delegates, showing their fabulous creations. For the first time, in 2008, a "best evening gown" prize was given to a designer; the winner was Gionni Straccia for Miss Monagas' dress. He also made the gown for Dayana Mendoza in the Miss Universe finals.

The winners chosen to represent Venezuela in the major pageants undergo continuous preparation before they compete internationally. These efforts are funded by corporate sponsors like Pepsi-Cola, Palmolive, Colgate, Ebel and Lux who were attracted to the pageant by its high ratings.

Participation in international pageants 

Miss Venezuela reached the semifinals of Miss Universe each year from 1983 to 2003, and reached the question-and-answer round consistently from 1991 to 2003 (winning in 1986 and 1996), constituting the longest streak of Miss Universe finalists by any country. This streak was ended in 2004, when Ana Karina Áñez was not included in the semifinals at Miss Universe 2004. Venezuela has also held Miss Universe and Miss World titles simultaneously in 1981 (Irene Saez and Pilin Leon), and Miss Universe and Miss Earth titles simultaneously in 2013 (Gabriela Isler and Alyz Henrich). Henrich's Miss Earth victory made Venezuela the only country in the world to have won each of the Big Four pageants multiple times. Venezuela also holds the distinction of being the first, and so far only, country to win back-to-back Miss Universe titles when Dayana Mendoza, outgoing Miss Universe 2008, crowned Stefania Fernandez as Miss Universe 2009.

Success in other fields 

Competing in the pageant can get a contestant noticed and launched on a successful television or print career. At least a dozen well-sought models come out of the pageant. Virtually all of Venezuela's female top models and television personalities are alumni of the pageant, including Maite Delgado (who competed in 1986 against future Miss Universe Bárbara Palacios and became the primary annual emcee of Miss Venezuela's live shows in recent decades), and Dominika van Santen (Top Model of the World 2005). In fact, only Gaby Espino and several other entertainment figures stand out as never having competed in the pageant. Many of today's top young models, such as Onelises Brochero and Wendy Medina, have repeatedly been rejected by Miss Venezuela; on the other hand, Goizeder Azua and Desiree Pallotta, who have variously been considered the top domestic supermodels in the country, joined the pageant after establishing their careers.

Nowadays, familiar faces on Spanish TV networks around the world, from Venezuela, include Ruddy Rodríguez, Catherine Fulop, Carolina Perpetuo, Norkys Batista, Daniela Kosán, Viviana Gibelli, Marjorie de Sousa, Chiquinquirá Delgado, Alicia Machado and Natalia Streignard. Two of the Latin world's best known people, supermodel Patricia Velásquez and singer/actress María Conchita Alonso, also participated, in 1989 and 1975, respectively.

Miss Universe 1981, Irene Sáez, became mayor of Chacao (Caracas), governor of Nueva Esparta State, and then a candidate in the 1998 Venezuelan presidential election. The Times of London ranked her 13th in its list of the 100 most powerful women in the world.

Alexandra Braun, Miss Earth 2005 became the most decorated international actress from Venezuela with the most acting awards when she won four international best actress awards in various film festivals all over the world for her portrayal of the lead role in the movie, "Uma" at the London Film Festival, Monaco International Film Festival, the Milan International Film Festival and the Georgia Latino Film Festival in Atlanta; the film also won recognition in the "Film of the World" category at the International Film Festival of India and won best foreign film at the Burbank International Film Festival in the United States.

Miss Venezuela and other countries 
Some delegates in the pageant went on to win other national pageants. Natascha Börger became the first Venezuelan to switch countries, when she won the Miss Germany title in 2002 after placing 14th at Miss Venezuela 2000. She went on to place in the Top 10 at Miss Universe 2002 in Puerto Rico while Cynthia Lander, Miss Venezuela 2001, placed fifth in the same competition. Miss Trujillo 2005 Angelika Hernandez Dorendorf also placed fourth at Miss Germany 2007 and cancelled her participation at the Miss Intercontinental of that same year in order to continue her master's degree. In 2006, Francys Sudnicka, who placed in the Top 10 representing Trujillo in Miss Venezuela 2003, won the Miss Poland Universe title. She represented Poland at Miss Universe 2006, and later represented Poland in Miss Earth 2006, taking a place in the Top 8. The following Venezuelans who have won the Miss Italia nel Mondo (Miss World Italy) pageant placed in the final five of Miss Venezuela: Barbara Clara (Miss Amazonas 2004), Valentina Patruno (Miss Miranda 2003) and Silvana Santaella (Miss Península de Paraguaná 2003). Patruno, though born Venezuelan, represented the United States.

In the past, other countries have sent their titleholders to be trained by Osmel Sousa and the Miss Venezuela Organization. In 1999, Miriam Quiambao of the Philippines trained in Venezuela before competing at Miss Universe 1999 in Trinidad and Tobago and eventually placing second to Botswana, while Carolina Indriago, Miss Venezuela 1998, appeared in the Top 5. The Miss Venezuela Organization, however, ended its policy allowing training of foreign candidates after Amelia Vega of the Dominican Republic received training from them before eventually winning Miss Universe 2003 in Panama, while Mariangel Ruiz, Miss Venezuela 2002, placed second behind her.

In recent years the pageant organization has begun to "import" expatriates who have been working as international models. Miami has produced Valentina Patruno (Miss World Venezuela 2003), Andrea Gómez (Miss International Venezuela 2004), Mónica Spear (Miss Venezuela 2004 and 4th runner-up at Miss Universe 2005), Ileana Jiménez (Miss Portuguesa 2005), and María Alessandra Villegas (Miss Península de Paraguaná 2008).

Order of succession 

There has been considerable controversy in a number of major national pageants as to how to direct their contestants to Miss Universe, Miss World, and the other international contests. The reason for this issue is the dispute between the international pageants, who generally desire that the winner of a national contest be sent. Although many nations such as Italy and Germany have completely separate pageants for Miss Universe and Miss World, in the case of Miss Venezuela the national pageant organization must field candidates to almost all of the major world contests.

Between 2000 and 2002, the Miss Venezuela pageant was split into two contests: the Miss World Venezuela pageant, to elect the representative to Miss World, from which a reduced group of contestants would go on to compete in Miss Venezuela to go to the Miss Universe contest. In 2002, the organization merged the Miss World Venezuela contest with the Gala de Belleza, making the final "state cut" before the election of the Miss World representative. The two pageants were rejoined in 2003. Using the most prominent format used in Miss Venezuela's entire run, the winners of the Miss Venezuela title (who goes to Miss Universe) and Miss World Venezuela are equal in rank. Nevertheless, the representative to Miss Universe is still announced last, and she is still considered the holder of the one single Miss Venezuela title. Nowadays, the final five finalists are announced during the telecast, followed by the elimination of the second and first runners-up, then Miss Venezuela to Miss International, Miss Venezuela to Miss World, and Miss Venezuela to Miss Universe. Since 2010, yet another new system has been introduced, with the fifth-place finisher as the 1st. runner-up, fourth place being designated as a "representative" to Miss Earth, the third place as a "representative" to Miss International and two 'equal' crowned winners—Miss Venezuela World and Miss Venezuela Universe.

While this system is similar to that of Mexico and India, in Mexico the first runner-up is known as the "substitute" and in the order of succession automatically fills into any title above her that is emptied. For example, if "Nuestra Belleza Mexico Mundo" (Miss Mexico to Miss World) is unable to fulfill her duties, the first runner-up assumes her title. While the Miss Universe representative is similarly considered the "greater of the two equals", if her position is vacated, the first runner-up ascends to her crown, instead of Miss Mexico-World becoming Miss Mexico-Universe and the first runner-up going to Miss World. In India, however, the succession does follow the other option: the top three titles go Earth->Universe->World in rising order of importance (although they are also emphasized as "equals").

In Venezuela, neither policy of succession is explicitly laid down. Osmel Sousa made the final decisions as to who is appointed when a vacancy arises; i.e. in 2003, there were significant rumors that Mariangel Ruiz might be replaced by Amara Barroeta, the first runner-up, to Miss Universe (and not Goizeder Azua, who was Miss World Venezuela). In fact, in 2003, the Miss International Pageant was concurrent with Miss Venezuela, meaning that it would be impossible to send a "fresh" contestant, and Osmel actually opted not to send Amara, who should have gone (as the first runner-up then was almost always automatically titled Miss Venezuela International) and instead replaced her with Goizeder Azua, who won Miss International 2003. Due to scheduling conflicts between Miss International and Miss Venezuela, a similar situation occurred in 2002 when Cynthia Lander, Miss Venezuela (Universe), gave up her crown to the next Miss Venezuela and immediately boarded a flight for Japan to participate in Miss International. The reasoning was that her first runner-up had already participated the year before, and it would have been ridiculous to crown a Miss Venezuela (International) and immediately send her on a plane to her contest with no specific preparation whatsoever. Incidentally in 2006 the Miss World pageant shifted its pageant date from its usual November–December timeframe to September when the organization announced Poland as the competition venue. Due to the change in dates; it resulted to a timing conflict with the Miss Venezuela pageant. The Miss Venezuela organization decided to hold a snap pageant called "Miss Venezuela Mundo" to elect a representative for Miss World 2006. The said competition was composed of former Miss Venezuela contestants from previous editions. At the end of the night Federica Guzman who represented the state of Miranda in 2001 was the winner. Thus, all four winners, Miss Earth Venezuela, Miss Venezuela International, Miss Venezuela World and Miss Venezuela Universe now compete in the year after their coronation.

Ironically, the only time in the "modern" pageant that the famous "if the winner should not fulfill her duties, the first runner-up will take over" statement was made for Miss Venezuela was in 1999. The decision was made to send whoever won to Miss World first, and then to Miss Universe if she did not win. This policy was adopted after the consecutive eliminations of Christina Dieckmann and Veronica Schneider in 1997 and 1998, both of whom were considered amongst the strongest Miss World Venezuelas in history and whose eliminations were seen by the organization as a signal that it needed to send its winner to Miss World. Therefore, in 1999, there were no Miss World Venezuela or Miss Venezuela International titles, only an official Miss Venezuela, who was Martina Thorogood. Her first runner-up, Norkys Batista, was told that she would become Miss Venezuela to Miss Universe only if Martina won the Miss World crown outright. Martina came in second at Miss World and she was expected continue on to Miss Universe 2000 the next year. However, due to a number of major controversies, she was barred from Miss Universe 2000 on the grounds that as the first runner-up to Miss World, Osmel also declared that Miss Universe demanded a winner from Venezuela, thereby barring Norkys Batista from succeeding to the title. The only option for Norkys to go was for Martina to renounce the Miss Venezuela title, which neither she or the organization was willing to do. Therefore, a new emergency (and temporary) pageant was held, called Miss Bolivarian Republic of Venezuela, which was conducted among ten former contestants (some semi-finalists and other non-finalists) from the previous five years. The winner, Claudia Moreno, had placed as seventh in the semi-finals behind Martina and Norkys in Miss Venezuela 1999, and she ended up performing excellently and becoming first runner-up to Miss Universe 2000. In years to come, 2002's first runner-up Amara Barroeta would join Norkys Batista as one of several runners-ups to be "denied" the chance to compete at a "big three" pageant.

In the US and many other countries, an occasion when the order of succession comes into play is when the reigning titleholder wins her international contest, e.g. in 1997 when Brook Mahealani Lee became Miss Universe and her first runner-up Brandi Sherwood became Miss USA. However, Venezuela does not have this official provision, even when the two "equal" winners both win Miss Universe and Miss World. In 1981, Miriam Quintana was considered somewhat unofficially as the serving Miss Venezuela, because both Irene Saez and Pilin Leon had won their respective pageants. However, in 1995–1996, when Alicia Machado took the Miss Universe title and Jacqueline Aguilera the Miss World crown, no new "Miss Venezuela" was appointed to hold the crown while they reigned internationally, though some newspapers said that Carla Steinkopf, Miss International Venezuela 1995, would give the crown to the 1996 winner. In general, all the times Venezuela has won the Miss Universe Pageant, it's Miss Universe herself who returns to crown the new Miss Venezuela, not Miss World Venezuela from the previous year or another finalist. Since 2013, the Miss World delegate is no longer crowned at the Miss Venezuela final but is crowned in a separate Miss Venezuela World pageant, and competes in the same year of her coronation. In 2014, Maira Alexandra Rodriguez was crowned as Miss Earth Venezuela to compete in the 2015 edition, but due to the destitution of her predecessor, Stephanie de Zorzi, she was sent to Miss Earth 2014, in which she ended as Miss Water (2nd runner-up). 

From 2015 onwards, Miss Earth Venezuela will compete in the same year of her coronation. In 2017, the announcing was made as it was years before: Top 5 consisting of 2nd and 1st runners-up, then Miss Venezuela International, Miss World Venezuela and Miss Venezuela Universe, all three competing in 2018. This avoids the rumors of major pageants not allowing contestants to participate if they weren't in their current reign year. However, in 2018, Osmel's resignation coincided with the same year Miss Venezuela sent their winner, Isabella Rodríguez, to Miss World. As a result, since 2019, the organization switched to a separate Miss World Venezuela national pageant while retaining the Miss Universe and Miss International national titles under the main Miss Venezuela pageant for all succeeding candidates.

Controversy

Objectification 
Esther Pineda, a Venezuelan women's studies expert, stated that the popularity of Miss Venezuela and other pageants in Venezuela reveals how the country is "deeply sexist". Despite controversies facing Miss Venezuela, the Me Too movement has not carried any significance in Venezuela. According to Pineda, in Venezuela “[p]hysical beauty is seen as a value. ... And it's given more importance than any other attribute".

Sexual exploitation 
Miss Venezuela contestants are often subject to prostitution and sexual exploitation. Young contestants are passed to powerful individuals in Venezuelan society for sexual favors. In a poverty-filled country, vulnerable women turn to wealthy individuals for funds. With participation often costing tens of thousands of United States dollars, these participants perform sexual favors for their wardrobe, cosmetic surgery, photo shoots and for sponsorships in order to "create the illusion of 'perfect' beauty" that is held in esteem in Venezuelan culture. Some contestants allegedly involved in such acts include Miss Venezuela 1989 participant Patricia Velásquez and Miss Venezuela 2006 runner-up Claudia Suárez.

Titleholders 

The following women have been crowned Miss Venezuela:

Winners gallery

Big Four pageants representatives 
The following women have represented Venezuela in the Big Four international beauty pageants.

Miss Venezuela Universo 

The winner of Miss Venezuela represents her country at Miss Universe. On occasion, when the winner does not qualify (due to age) for either contest, a runner-up is sent.

Miss Venezuela Mundo 

In recent years Miss Venezuela Mundo under Miss Venezuela Organization holds a separate contest to select its winner to Miss World pageant.

Miss World Venezuela gallery

Miss Venezuela Internacional 

The 2nd Runner-up of Miss Venezuela traditionally represented her country at Miss International. In recent years Miss Venezuela selects a runner-up or second position at Miss Venezuela pageant as Miss Venezuela Internacional winner. The winner goes to Miss International.

Miss Venezuela Tierra 

Since its establishment in 2001 Miss Earth Venezuela is chosen by another organization, called Sambil Model Organization. From 2010 to 2015 Miss Earth Venezuela was chosen by the beauty czar Osmel Sousa. In 2010, Miss Venezuela Organization acquired the franchise for Miss Earth Venezuela and the organization declared that Miss Earth, along with Miss Universe and Miss World contests, is one of the three largest beauty pageants in the world in terms of the number of participating countries. The organization conducted a selection process which attended by several former beauty queens and runners up to qualify for participation. Mariángela Bonanni  who competed in the Miss Venezuela 2009 (placed as first runner up) representing the state of Táchira, was chosen by the organization to participate in Miss Earth 2010. Since 2016,  Venezuela representatives at the Miss Earth are chosen in a separate pageant Miss Earth Venezuela. Although Miss Venezuela Organization is not related to Sambil Model Organization, here are Venezuela's Miss Earth representatives sent by the Sambil Model Organization, Miss Venezuela Organization and Miss Earth Venezuela Organization .

Gallery of Miss Earth Venezuela

See also 
 Big Four international beauty pageants
 List of beauty contests
 List of Miss Venezuela titleholders

References

External links 

Miss Venezuela Official Website
Miss Venezuela La Nueva Era MB

 
Venevisión original programming
Recurring events established in 1952
Venezuela
1952 establishments in Venezuela
Venezuelan culture
Venezuelan awards
Venezuela